Eugène Coulon (born 1878, date of death unknown) was a French male water polo player. He was a member of the Pupilles de Neptune de Lille water polo team. He won with the team the bronze medal at the 1900 Summer Olympics.

See also
 List of Olympic medalists in water polo (men)

References

External links
 

1878 births
Place of birth missing
Place of death missing
Date of birth missing
Year of death missing
French male water polo players
Water polo players at the 1900 Summer Olympics
Olympic medalists in water polo
Medalists at the 1900 Summer Olympics
Olympic water polo players of France
Olympic bronze medalists for France